Keytsville is an unincorporated community in Parke and Putnam counties, in the U.S. state of Indiana.

Geography

References

Unincorporated communities in Parke County, Indiana
Unincorporated communities in Putnam County, Indiana
Unincorporated communities in Indiana